Barda Wildlife Sanctuary is located in Gujarat, India. Previous to its 1979 establishment as a wildlife sanctuary, Barda was a private reserve for Porbandar and Jamnagar. Approximately 4,00,000 people live in Barda.

Geography
The terrain is hilly and undulating; there are slopes and exposed rocks. The tropical climate is characterized by very hot summers. There are two rivers, Bileshvary River and Joghri River, and two dams, Khambala and Fodara. There are several forest sub-types, such as southern tropical forest, southern dry mixed deciduous forest and northern tropical thorn forest, while other predominant flora include Euphorbia scrub, dry deciduous scrub, and dry bamboo brakes. The sanctuary area supports around 750 ‘maldhari’ families in 68 ‘nesses’. The agricultural fields and wasteland, where water scarcity is the main problem. And these maldhari families encounter this problem throughout summer months. And the green patch of the sanctuary helps to provide ecological balance by improving the water system of the area by restoring the ground water. One can also visit Kileshwar, a temple improved by ‘Jamsahib’ of Jamnagar, is a magnificent attraction of this area. Barda Hills Wildlife Sanctuary range is a green valley, encompassed by timberland and agricultural fields.

Flora and fauna
There are several forest sub-types, such as southern tropical forest, southern dry mixed deciduous forest and northern tropical thorn forest, while other predominant flora include Euphorbia scrub, dry deciduous scrub, and dry bamboo brakes. Important fauna are blue bull, chinkara, blackbuck, and wolf. While Barda was known to have had a population of Asiatic lions, they deserted the area towards the end of the nineteenth century. A proposed reintroduction programme by the state government was cancelled.

See also
 Arid Forest Research Institute
List of national parks and wildlife sanctuaries of Gujarat, India

References

Protected areas established in 1979
Wildlife sanctuaries in Gujarat
Porbandar district
1979 establishments in Gujarat